The Deanery of St. John's Cathedral, Warsaw (Polish: Pałac Dziekana w Warszawie) is a historic building located on ulica Dziekania (Deanery Street) in the Old Town of Warsaw, Poland.

Since 2016 the Deanery has been the home of the Museum of the Archdiocese of Warsaw.

History
In the fourteenth century, as mentioned in historic sources of 1339, the present site of the Deanery was the location of the former rectory of St. John's Church.

The Deanery's masonry building was constructed at the turn of the fifteenth and sixteenth centuries on a large plot of land ceded by the Royal Castle.  In 1607 the building burned in a city fire. Three years later, it was rebuilt as a residence for Dean J. Raciborski. In the 18th century, it was home to a theological seminary.  In 1838 the palace's grounds were reduced in favor of the Castle, and in 1844 the building was converted into a tenement house. In 1870–1939, the Deanery  housed offices and Castle employees.

During the 1944 Warsaw Uprising, the building suffered substantial damage. Only small fragments of the ground floor and first floor survived. Almost all of Dziekania (Deanery) Street, including St. John's Cathedral, was destroyed by the explosion of a German Goliath tracked mine.

In 1966-68 the Deanery was rebuilt to a design by Stanisław Marzyński, with a somewhat modified appearance relative to its prewar one.

Since 2016 the Deanery has been home to the Museum of the Archdiocese of Warsaw.

References

Palaces in Warsaw